Lascabanes (Languedocien: Las Cabanas) is a former commune in the Lot department in south-western France. On 1 January 2018, it was merged into the new commune of Lendou-en-Quercy.

Geography 
The village is partly located at the beginning of the Lendou valley and on a limestone plateau. It is crossed by the GR 65 which goes to Santiago de Compostela from Le Puy-en-Velay.

Administration
List of mayors since 1802 :

1802-1808: Jean Lagineste
1809-1817: François Jacques Barayre
1817-1818: François Taillade
1818-1834: François Jacques Barayre
1834-1838: Antoine Combeles
1839-1852: Jean Barayre
1852-1860: Jean-Pierre Baffallie
1860-1865: Etienne Raynal
1865-1870: Bernard Autefage
1870-1871: Jean Vignals
1871-1876: Bernard Autefage
1876-1878: Antoine Lamouroux
1878-1890: Jean-Baptiste Denegre
1891-1892: Jean Vignals
1892-1902: Jean-Baptiste Denegre
1902-1907: Raymond Clary
1907-1919: Jean Alis
1919-1959: Henri Autefage
1959-1971: Georges Garrigues
1971-1989: Maurice Borredon
1989-1996: Christian Proust
1996-2001: Jean Fourniols
2001-2008: Marc Espitalié
2008-2017: Bernard Vignals

See also
Communes of the Lot department

References

External links 
 

Former communes of Lot (department)
Lendou-en-Quercy